Zhenmei station, is a station on Line 6 Branch of the Shenzhen Metro. It opened on 28 November 2022.

Station layout

Exits

References

Shenzhen Metro stations
Railway stations in Guangdong
Railway stations in China opened in 2022